The 2006–07 Toyota Racing Series was the third Toyota Racing Series season. It began on 4 November 2006 at Pukekohe Park Raceway in New Zealand and ended on 22 April 2007, also at Pukekohe.

Teams and drivers
The following teams and drivers have competed during the 2006–07 Toyota Racing Series. All teams used Tatuus TT104ZZ chassis with Toyota engine.

International Drivers
Nine drivers in all: USA's Michael Johnson, Italy's Edoardo Piscopo, Bahrain's Hamad Al Fardan, Britain's Ben Clucas and five Australian drivers.

Calendar

Results
The series was won by Daniel Gaunt.

References

 Final standings on Driver Database

Toyota Racing Series
Toyota Racing Series
Toyota Racing Series